Chhand is a quatrain used in the poetic traditions of North India and Pakistan.

Chhands in culture
In the culture of the northwestern part of the Indian subcontinent, it is customary for chhands to be recited at ceremonial occasions such as weddings, where they are used by grooms to praise their in-laws. Formerly, the form was extensively employed by court bards to praise royal personages. Chhands are also used extensively in the Nautanki dance-drama tradition of the region, especially in the alha chhand or bir chhand formats. A typical Punjabi wedding chhand might extol the mother- and father-in-law, for instance this one, which says the groom holds them in the same esteem as his own parents -

A Rajasthani language chhand, from the poem Haldighati by Kanhaiyalal Sethia, describes Maharana Pratap's determination to fight on against the Mughals at all costs -

Chhands in religion

Jaap Sahib is the morning prayer of the Sikhs. The Prayer or Bani was composed by the tenth Sikh Master, Guru Gobind Singh. Jaap Sahib is made up of 199 verses and is the first Bani of the Dasam Granth (p. 1-10). The Jaap Sahib begins with "Sri Mukhwakh Patshahi Dasvee," "By the holy mouth of the Tenth King." This appears to be a specific saying to authenticate the writings of Guru Gobind Singh himself. The language of Jaap, is close to classical with words and compounds drawn from Sanskrit, Brij Bhasha, Arabic and Urdu. The contents of Jaap Sahib, are divided into various Chhands bearing the name of the related meter according to the then prevalent system of prosody in India.Jaap Sahib is a total and complete introduction to a non-individual Creator, or Nature itself, or the Forces of Universe, or the Laws of Nature.

Etymology
The term is derived from the Sanskrit word chhanda, which refers to the study of Vedic meter. However, in North India and Pakistan, chhand has come to mean a specific poetic style associated with the modern languages native to the region, such as Punjabi, Hindko, Dogri, Hindustani and Rajasthani.

See also
Chaupai (poetry)
Doha (poetry)
Chaupai (Sikhism)
Collection of Wedding Chhand - marriagesloks.blogspot.in

References

Stanzaic form
Indian poetics
Poetic rhythm